, born and raised in Tokyo, was a Japanese printmaker. Watanabe was famous for his biblical prints rendered in the mingei (folk art) tradition of Japan. As a student of the master textile dye artist Serizawa Keisuke (1895–1984), Watanabe was associated with the mingei (folk art) movement.

Early life
Watanabe's father died when he was ten years old. He dropped out of school at an early age and became an apprentice in a dyer's shop. A Christian woman in his neighborhood invited the fatherless boy to attend church with her. At the age of seventeen, Watanabe received baptism.

The path towards printmaking
The young Watanabe worked in dyers' shops, sketching patterns and dyeing clothes. In 1937, one year after Yanagi Sōetsu (1889–1961), father of the Japanese mingei (folk art) movement, had established the Folk Art Museum, the 24-year-old Watanabe saw an exhibition of Serizawa Keisuke's (1895–1984) work. The event sowed the seeds of Watanabe's artistic endeavor. A few years later, Watanabe attended a study group in which Serizawa taught his katazome technique of stencilling and dyeing, which originated in Okinawa. From then on, the teacher-and-student relationship between Serizawa and Watanabe became strong and abiding.

Subject matter and technique
The subject matter of Watanabe's prints is exclusively the gospel rendered in the mingei (folk art) approach. Influenced by Buddhist figure prints, Watanabe placed biblical subjects in a Japanese context. In The Last Supper (1981) Watanabe depicts the disciples in kimono. On the table are bottles of sake and sushi.

Watanabe uses kozo paper (from mulberry tree) and momigami (kneaded paper). The momigami paper was crumpled by hand, squeezed and wrinkled to give a rough quality to the prints. The katazome method uses traditional organic and mineral pigments in a medium of soybean milk. The protein in the milk bound the colors to the paper's surface. The use of natural materials is one of the characteristics of mingei (folk art).

International recognition
In 1958, Watanabe received first prize at the Modern Japanese Print Exhibition held in New York City for The Bronze Serpent showing Moses and the people of Israel. Watanabe's Kiku ("Listening") (1960) was featured in the novelist James Michener's The Modern Japanese Print (1962), a book that introduced ten sōsaku-hanga artists to the Western audience.

The Vatican Museum, the British Museum, the Museum of Modern Art in New York, the National Museum of Modern Art in Tokyo, Gallery 1252 in Klaipeda and many other leading museums in the world had exhibited Watanabe's works. During President Lyndon Johnson's administration, Watanabe's prints were hung in the White House.

The artist's philosophy
Watanabe once remarked that he preferred that his prints hang in the ordinary places of life: "I would most like to see them [his prints] hanging where people ordinarily gather, because Jesus brought the gospel for the people". Such is the mingei philosophy of art for the people and by the people.

References and further reading
 Michener, James A., The Modern Japanese Print: An Appreciation, Tuttle Publishing, Rutland, Vermont, 1968, pp. 27–30
 .
 .
 .
 Heeding the Voice of Heaven, Sadao Watanabe, Biblical Stencil Prints, Brauer Museum of Art, 2010, Valparaiso.
 Beauty given by grace, The biblical prints of Sadao Watanabe, ed. Sandra Bowden, 2012, Baltimore.
 Biblical Prints by Sadao Watanabe - All Thy Marvelous Works, (渡辺禎雄聖書版画集 くすしきみわざ), Shinkyo Publishing, 2013, Tokyo.

External links
Watanabe Sadao's works at Los Angeles County Museum of Art
 The SadaoHanga Catalogue:

Japanese printmakers
Japanese Christians
1913 births
1996 deaths
Sosaku hanga artists